An elytron is a modified, hardened forewing of beetles (Coleoptera), though a few of the true bugs (Hemiptera) such as the family Schizopteridae are extremely similar; in true bugs, the forewings are called hemelytra (sometimes alternatively spelled as "hemielytra"), and in most species only the basal half is thickened while the apex is membranous, but when they are entirely thickened the condition is referred to as "coleopteroid". An elytron is sometimes also referred to as a shard.

Description
The elytra primarily serve as protective wing-cases for the hindwings underneath, which are used for flying. To fly, a beetle typically opens the elytra and then extends the hindwings, flying while still holding the elytra open, though many beetles in the families Scarabaeidae and Buprestidae can fly with the elytra closed (e.g., most Cetoniinae).

In a number of groups, the elytra are reduced to various degrees, (e.g., the beetle families Staphylinidae and Ripiphoridae), or secondarily lost altogether, as in various Elateroidea lineages with wingless females.

In some flightless groups, the elytra are present but fused together, and the hindwings are absent (e.g., some ground beetles (Carabidae), scarab beetles, and weevils).

References

Insect anatomy